"Hear the Music" is a song by House music DJ/Producer Todd Terry, who recorded the track under the alias "Gypsymen." The single reached the top spot on Billboard's Dance Club Songs Chart in April 1992 and stayed there for one week.

The garage/house track is best known for its heavy computer tribal drum beats, non-stop scatting male vocals, female vocals chanting "I hear the music!" and the looping keyboard sampling of Machine's 1979 disco song "There But for the Grace of God Go I."

Track listings
 12" vinyl (US)
A1   "Hear the Music" (Def Club Mix) (5:48) 
A2   "Hear the Music" (Def Dub Mix) (4:22) 
B   "Bounce" (Wild Warped Mix) (5:55)

References

External links
Single release information at Discogs
2014 live performance at YouTube

1992 singles
Todd Terry songs
1992 songs